Behind the Eyes is Tim Moore's second full-length album. It was released in 1975 on Asylum Records. It includes the song "Rock and Roll Love Letter", which was covered by Bay City Rollers. The album charted at number 181 on the Billboard 200.

Track listing

References

Tim Moore (singer-songwriter) albums
1975 albums
Asylum Records albums